Marielle Berger Sabbatel (born 29 January 1990) is a French freestyle skier, specializing in ski cross and alpine skier.

Berger Sabbatel competed at the 2014 Winter Olympics and 2018 Winter Olympics  for France. She finished 17th in the seeding run for the ski cross event. In the first round, she finished third in her heat, failing to advance.

Berger Sabbatel made her Freestyle World Cup debut in December 2011. As of December 2019, she has nine World Cup podium finishes, with her best a gold medal at Innichen in December 2019. Her best Freestyle World Cup overall finish in ski cross is 3rd, in 2012–13.

World Cup Podiums

References

External links
 
 
 
 
 

1990 births
Living people
French female alpine skiers
French female freestyle skiers
Olympic freestyle skiers of France
Freestyle skiers at the 2014 Winter Olympics
Freestyle skiers at the 2018 Winter Olympics
People from Bourg-Saint-Maurice
Sportspeople from Savoie